Events from the year 1607 in Denmark.

Incumbents 

 Monarch - Christian IV
 Steward of the Realm

Events

Births 

10 December – Kjeld Stub, priest (died 1663)

Deaths 
 14 May   Lauge Beck, landholder, judge and royal treasurer (botrn c. 1530)

References 

 
Denmark
Years of the 17th century in Denmark